Ron Haskins is an American political scientist, focusing in several political topic issues, currently the Cabot Family Chair at Brookings Institution and an Elected Fellow of the American Academy of Political and Social Science. He won a Daniel Patrick Moynihan prize with Isabel Sawhill.

Life
He graduated from University of North Carolina at Chapel Hill with a Ph.D. in Developmental Psychology in 1975. He served on the staff of the House Ways and Means Committee, and presidential Senior Advisor for Welfare Policy.

Works
Show Me the Evidence: Obama's Fight for Rigor and Evidence in Social Policy Washington, D.C. : Brookings Institution Press, 2015. (With Greg Margolis.) , 
Work over Welfare: The Inside Story of the 1996 Welfare Reform Law Washington : Brookings Institution Press, 2007. ,

References

External links

Year of birth missing (living people)
Living people
American political scientists
United States presidential advisors
Brookings Institution people